"Graveyard Shift" is the first part of the 16th episode of the second season, and the 36th episode overall, of the American animated television series SpongeBob SquarePants. The episode was written by Mr. Lawrence, Jay Lender and Dan Povenmire, and the animation was directed by Sean Dempsey. Lender and Povenmire also served as storyboard directors. The episode was copyrighted in 2001 and aired on Nickelodeon in the United States on September 6, 2002.

The series follows the adventures and endeavours of the title character and his various friends in the underwater city of Bikini Bottom. In the episode, Squidward and SpongeBob are forced to work 24 hours a day by their boss Mr. Krabs. Squidward soon becomes bored, and tells SpongeBob a made-up story to scare him of the night shift. After scaring SpongeBob, Squidward tells him that the story is fictional. However, later that night, the events in the story begin to occur.

The episode featured stock footage of Max Schreck as Count Orlok from the 1922 silent film Nosferatu. Episode writer Lender proposed the idea as a gag at the end of the episode, which series creator Stephen Hillenburg accepted. Before the idea of Count Orlok, Lender thought of "Floorboard Harry", an idea that was deleted. The episode received critical acclaim upon release.

Plot
Squidward eagerly prepares to leave work at the Krusty Krab as it closes. When he refuses to take a last-minute order from a customer, Mr. Krabs overhears the conversation and asks the customer if he would give the Krusty Krab money if they stayed open later, and he agrees. Mr. Krabs is inspired to create a night shift, leaving an eager SpongeBob and an annoyed Squidward to work 24-hours a day.

Exasperated with his boss' demands and annoyed with SpongeBob, Squidward tries to scare SpongeBob into being afraid of the night shift by telling him a made-up story about the "Hash-Slinging Slasher", a former fry cook at the Krusty Krab who accidentally cut off his own hand, replaced it with a spatula, and was fired and killed after being run over by a bus. Squidward continues by telling SpongeBob that every Tuesday night, the ghost of the Slasher returns to the Krusty Krab to get revenge on those who fired him. Squidward says that the Slasher's arrival will be indicated by three warnings: the lights flickering on and off, the phone ringing without any reply from the calling party, and the ghost of the bus that ran over the Slasher arriving to drop him off. After Squidward finishes his story, SpongeBob reacts with fear; although amused at first, Squidward becomes irritated and admits that he made the whole story up.

Later at 3AM when the restaurant is empty, Squidward is soon alarmed by the flickering lights and ringing phone, while SpongeBob thinks Squidward is simply pranking him. A bus shows up outside the Krusty Krab and drops off a mysterious dark silhouette matching the description of the Hash-Slinging Slasher. SpongeBob and Squidward become terrified, but the figure turns out to be simply a fish applying for a job, stating that he had tried calling the Krusty Krab by telephone earlier, but had hung up out of nervousness. The three discover that the flickering lights were caused by "Nosferatu", with whom the characters are inexplicably familiar, flicking the light switch on and off.

Production

"Graveyard Shift" was written by Mr. Lawrence, Jay Lender and Dan Povenmire, with Sean Dempsey as animation director. Lender and Povenmire also served as storyboard directors. The episode originally aired on Nickelodeon in the United States on September 6, 2002 at 8:00pm, with a TV-Y7 parental rating.

Lender proposed to have Count Orlok of the 1922 silent film Nosferatu appear as a gag in the final scene. Series creator Stephen Hillenburg accepted Lender's proposal and agreed. Lender said, "Steve gave you the opportunities to do things that would really be memorable, if you could sell him on it." Lender then searched for books with scannable pictures of Count Orlok. However, the used image of Orlok was taken from the Internet. He said, "I searched what little there was of the Web back then." Nick Jennings Photoshopped the smile on Orlok to make sure it matched Lender's board drawing. Lender said, "It was my baby, and I held its hand until we shipped it overseas to Rough Draft Studios in South Korea." Before Orlok, Lender thought of "Floorboard Harry", a deleted gag that concludes the broadcast episode, in which he initially flickers the lights.

"Graveyard Shift" was released on the DVD compilation titled SpongeBob SquarePants: Nautical Nonsense and Sponge Buddies on March 12, 2002. It was also included on the SpongeBob SquarePants: The Complete 2nd Season DVD released on October 19, 2004. On September 22, 2009, the episode was released on the SpongeBob SquarePants: The First 100 Episodes, alongside all of the episodes of seasons one through five. On September 14, 2010, "Graveyard Shift" was released on the 10 Happiest Moments DVD.

Reception
"Graveyard Shift" received critical acclaim upon release and is often cited as one of the show's best episodes. Jordan Moreau, Katcy Stephan and David Viramontes of Variety ranked the episode the fifth-best SpongeBob episode, particularly calling the Nosferatu scene "perfectly represents the nonsensical comedy that keeps SpongeBob fans hungry for more." Emily Esteem of WeGotThisCovered.com ranked the episode  2 on her "Top 10 Episodes of SpongeBob SquarePants" list, saying, "It is another scary episode of SpongeBob, and it's my favorite one." She added, "I love 'Graveyard Shift' for a myriad of reasons, but mostly because it puts the two SpongeBob SquarePants characters with the best chemistry together: Squidward and SpongeBob. The episode is kind of like a puzzle, and SpongeBob's relentless cheer in the midst of likely doom is inspiring."

In his review for DVD Talk, Jason Bovberg praised the episode for its "spooky wonderfulness", stating that the episode scared his daughter. Paul Mavis of DVD Talk said, "A fun, 'scary' (for little kids) SpongeBob that adults will appreciate, 'Graveyard Shift' uses the old standby of the headless/handless/legless (take your pick) killer-seeking-revenge stories we all told as kids, and cleverly grafts it onto a 'SpongeBob at work' storyline." Mavis added, "I always enjoy it when Rodger Bumpass, the voice actor for Squidward, gets quiet and manipulative when he's shining SpongeBob on, and here's one of the best examples of that." He praised Count Orlok's cameo, "especially when they animate the vampire's face into a goofy, giddy smile." Mike Jackson of DVD Verdict said the episode is one of his "personal faves." He also said "The episode has everything that makes the show great: funny dialogue (the whole story of the Hash-Slinging Slasher is hilarious), clever sight gags (especially SpongeBob's regenerating limbs), and that aforementioned outta-nowhere ending that made me bust a gut."

The 2012 pop art painting The Walk Home, by American artist and designer KAWS, is based on a still from this episode. It sold at auction at Sotheby's for $6 million. The alterations to the image, originally from a shot where SpongeBob screams in terror at the story of the Hash-Slinging Slasher, have been described in the Sotheby's catalogue essay as emphasizing the universality of the character's existential anxiety, and as having "more in common with such emotionally-laden works as Francisco de Goya's politically charged The Third of May 1808 than any plotline from the children's cartoon show".

References

External links

2002 American television episodes
SpongeBob SquarePants episodes
Nosferatu